Recke is a German-language surname.

 Elisa von der Recke (1754–1833), Baltic German writer and poet
 Heinrich Recke (1890–1943), German general
 Johann Friedrich von Recke (1764–1846), senior public official in the Baltic Germans Duchy of Courland

German-language surnames